The alcohol licensing laws of Ireland regulate the sale and consumption of alcohol. The legislation controlling licensing regulations is the Intoxicating Liquor Act 2008, Intoxicating Liquor Act 2003, Intoxicating Liquor Act 2000, the Licensing Act 1872 and the Criminal Justice (Public Order) Act 1994.

References

See also 
 Alcohol licensing laws of the United Kingdom

Ireland